Honorable Eugene Lenn Nagbe is the Minister of Information, Cultural Affairs, and Tourism of the Republic of Liberia. He was born on August 11, 1969, in Harper Maryland County, Southeastern Liberia. He undertook primary and secondary education in Harper before enrolling at the University of Liberia where he earned a bachelor's degree in mass communication.

He was Secretary-General of the Congress for Democratic Change (CDC), a political party in Liberia organized and formed by soccer legend and current President of Liberia George Weah.

Nagbe was previously an assistant police commissioner from 1998 to 2000, Chief of Staff to the Vice President of Liberia from 2000 to 2003 and Minister of Post and Telecommunications from 2003 to 2006.

Spouse : Marcia Gooding

References 

1969 births
Living people
Ministers of Posts and Telecommunications (Liberia)
Liberian politicians